Libianca Kenzonkinboum Fonji, known mononymously as Libianca, born , is a Cameroonian American Afrobeats singer. She competed in the twenty-first season of American TV show The Voice in 2021. She is best known for her 2022 breakout single "People", which was inspired by her cyclothymia. The song debuted No. 2 on the US Billboard Afrobeats chart and received traction on social media.

Early life and career 
Libianca Fonji was born in 2000 or 2001 in Minneapolis, Minnesota she relocated to Cameroon with her mother, brother and father when she was four years old.

2021-present: The Voice and "People"
In 2021, Libianca competed on the 21st season of NBC's The Voice, where Blake Shelton was her coach. She made her way to the top 20 before being eliminated.

"Everything I Wanted" and "Woman" were later released as singles via West Side Creative Agency.

Libianca signed to 5K Records and Sony in 2022. In December 2022, Libianca released "People".

Discography 
Singles

References 

21st-century African-American women singers
21st-century American singers
21st-century American women singers
American people of Cameroonian descent
Living people
The Voice (franchise) contestants
Year of birth missing (living people)